Following is a list of dams and reservoirs in Nebraska.

All major dams are linked below.

Dams and reservoirs in Nebraska 

This list is incomplete.  You can help Wikipedia by expanding it.

 Bartley Diversion Dam, Republican River, United States Bureau of Reclamation
 Box Butte Dam, Niobrara River, USBR
 Cambridge Diversion Dam, Republican River, USBR
 Culbertson Diversion Dam, Frenchman Creek, USBR
 Davis Creek Dam, Davis Creek, USBR
 Dry Spotted Tail Diversion Dam, Dry Spotted Tail Creek, USBR
 Dunlap Diversion Dam, Niobrara River, USBR
 Enders Dam, Frenchman Creek, USBR
 Gavins Point Dam (in Nebraska and South Dakota), Lewis and Clark Lake, Missouri River, United States Army Corps of Engineers
 Kent Diversion Dam, North Loup, USBR
 Harlan County Reservoir, Republican River, United States Army Corps of Engineers
 Kingsley Dam, Lake McConaughy, Central Nebraska Public Power and Irrigation District
 Lake Alice No 1 Dam, offstream equalizing reservoir, USBR
 Lake Alice No 1 and 1 Half, offstream equalizing reservoir, USBR
 Lake Alice No 2 Dam, offstream equalizing reservoir, USBR
 Medicine Creek Dam, Medicine Creek, USBR
 Merritt Dam, Snake River, USBR
 Milburn Diversion Dam, Middle Loup, USBR
 Minatare Dam, offstream equalizing reservoir, USBR
 Papio Creek Dams, Glenn Cunningham Lake, USACE
 Red Willow Creek Diversion Dam, Red Willow Creek, USBR
 Red Willow Dam, Red Willow Creek, USBR
 Sherman Dam, Sherman Reservoir, Loup Basin Reclamation District
 Spencer Dam, Niobrara River, Nebraska Public Power District
 Superior Courtland Diversion Dam, Republican River, USBR
 Trenton Dam, Republican River, USBR
 Tub Springs Creek Diversion Dam, Tub Springs Creek, USBR
 Virginia Smith Dam, Calamus River, USBR

References 

 
 
Nebraska
Dams
Dams